Ma Xiguang's wife (name unknown) was the wife of Ma Xiguang, the fourth ruler of the Chinese Five Dynasties and Ten Kingdoms Period state Chu.

Little is known about her historically — not even her name.  She became Chu's princess after Ma Xiguang assumed the title of prince after the death of his older brother Ma Xifan in 947.  Another older brother of Ma Xiguang's, Ma Xi'e, objected and attacked Chu's capital Changsha in 950, and the city fell in early 951.  She, Ma Xiguang, and one or more sons hid at Ci Hall (慈堂), but were eventually discovered.  She was caned to death publicly, and the people of the state mourned her greatly.

Notes and references 

951 deaths
Executed Ma Chu people
People executed by Ma Chu
People executed by blunt trauma
Year of birth unknown